Infant Preparatory Matriculation Higher Secondary School otherwise known as IMPHSS is located in Periyar Nagar, Vriddhachalam. The school was established in 1987.

The correspondent and principal of this school is Ms. Vijaya Kumari Ph.D. IMPHSS offers education from the grades of LKG to the 12th standard. This is an English medium school and the school is a co-educational institution.

The school is affiliated with the State Board for both secondary and higher secondary levels.

The students at IPMHSS always score the highest marks in their exams and overall classes. The teaching system and educational system are managed first-hand by the correspondent. IPMHSS has an exceptional system and structure and it is one of a kind. The school has a very dedicated and sincere network of teaching staff and administration.

Aside from the IPMHSS' excellent teaching methodology and academic sphere, the school offers a variety of extracurricular activities like martial arts, music, sports, etc. 

High schools and secondary schools in Tamil Nadu
Education in Cuddalore district
Educational institutions established in 1988
1988 establishments in Tamil Nadu